Dianne Nelson Oberhansly (born 1954 Utah) is an American short story writer.

She was raised in Nevada, Kansas, and Arizona, and graduated from Arizona State University with a B.A. and M.F.A.  She has taught widely in public schools and private writing workshops.
She married Curtis Oberhansly, who is a founding director of Boulder Community Alliance.

Awards
 1993 Flannery O'Connor Award for Short Fiction

Works

References

American short story writers
1954 births
Living people
Arizona State University alumni
Writers from Utah